Gustavo Javier Barrera Castro, commonly known as Panchi Barrera (born April 6, 1985, in Uruguay) is an Uruguayan-Spanish professional basketball player. His jersey's number is 9. He is a longtime member of the Uruguay national basketball team and is currently playing professionally with Hebraica y Macabi of Liga Uruguaya de Basketball.

Professional career
Barrera started his professional career in 2001 with Welcome Montevideo in Uruguay. He played several years with DKV Joventut in Spain, including six games with the team at the ULEB Cup 2003-04. After several years on the bench, he had his best season back in Uruguay in 2007-08 for second place Hebraica y Macabi, averaging 14.1 points and 6.9 assists per game.

Following this season, he was invited to play on the Houston Rockets' summer league team over the 2008 summer.  
After that he played a season with Club Atlético Atenas, he averaged 36.7 minutes per game, 17.0 points per game, 4.0 rebounds per game and 9.0 assists per game. 
He played for Trotamundos de Carabobo of the Venezuelan Professional Basketball League.
At the moment he has got the highest number of assists per game at the Liga Uruguaya de Basketball averaging 7.0 assists per game, a total of 300 in the league.

National team career
Barrera made his debut for the Uruguay senior team at the 2008 South American Championship, averaging 10.5 points and 5.2 assists per game.  He also played for the team at the FIBA Americas Championship 2009.

References

External links 
 FIBA Profile
 Euroleague.net Profile
 Latinbasket.com Profile
 Spanish League Profile 

1985 births
Living people
AB Castelló players
Baloncesto Málaga players
Basketball players at the 2007 Pan American Games
CB Breogán players
CB Granada players
Guaiqueríes de Margarita players
Joventut Badalona players
Liga ACB players
Melilla Baloncesto players
Pan American Games bronze medalists for Uruguay
Pan American Games medalists in basketball
Point guards
Shooting guards
Spanish men's basketball players
Sportspeople from Montevideo
Trotamundos B.B.C. players
Uruguayan men's basketball players
Medalists at the 2007 Pan American Games